The 2020–21 Handball Championship of Bosnia and Herzegovina was the 20th season of this championship, with teams from Bosnia and Herzegovina participating in it. RK Borac Banja Luka were the men's defending champions, and HŽRK Grude were the women's defending champions.

RK Izviđač won the men's title, ŽRK Borac won the women's title.

Premier handball league for men

Competition format 
Sixteen teams joined the regular season, played as double round robin tournament.

2020-21 Season participants 

The following 16 clubs compete in the Handball Premier League during the 2020-21 season.

Standings

Clubs in European competitions

Premier handball league for women

Competition format 
Eleven teams joined the regular season, played as double round robin tournament.

2020-21 Season participants 
The following 11 clubs compete in the Handball Premier League during the 2020-21 season.

Standings

Clubs in European competitions

References 

Handball Championship of Bosnia and Herzegovina
2020–21 domestic handball leagues